The .30-378 Weatherby Magnum is a .30 caliber, belted, bottle-necked rifle cartridge.  The cartridge was developed in response to a US Army military contract in 1959. While still unreleased to the public, the cartridge went on to set world records for accuracy including the first ten 10X in  benchrest shooting. It is currently the highest velocity .30 caliber factory ammunition available.

Cartridge origin
The .30-378 was originally designed by Roy Weatherby as an anti-personnel/anti-materiel military cartridge for a government contract. The cartridge was created by necking down the .378 Weatherby Magnum to accept a  diameter bullet. The United States Army’s Redstone Arsenal requested a rifle cartridge that could develop  for the effects of light bullets against armor.

However, the shooting public had to wait until 1996 for Weatherby to release the cartridge. In the meantime, the .30-378 Weatherby Magnum had gone on to set world records in  benchrest competitions. Earl Chronister, shooting a .30-378 Weatherby Magnum shot the first ever ten shot 10X with the first nine shot to 3.125 inches and the tenth flyer for an overall group of 4.375 inches. This record stood for over 30 years. Several variations of the .30-378 Weatherby Magnum were created by custom ammunition manufacturers, known as wildcatters. Hammond rifles and H-S Precision were among the several custom gun manufacturers who chambered and built rifles long before Weatherby got around to releasing the rifle to the public.

In 1991 Shooting Times editor Layne Simpson met with Ed Weatherby, the son of Weatherby Inc. founder Roy Weatherby, and urged him to release the .30-378 Weatherby to the public as a standard chambering in the Mark V action. In 1995 Layne Simpson built a rifle chambered for the .30-378 Weatherby and developed loading data and passed the data on to Norma Precision to provide a basis for their factory loaded ammunition.

Design and specification
The .30-378 Weatherby Magnum utilizes the .378 Weatherby Magnum as a parent cartridge. The .378 Weatherby case was necked down to accept a .30 caliber (7.62 mm) bullet while preserving the double radii shoulder of the parent case. The resulting case held a greater volume than any previous commercial cartridge.

When the cartridge was created by Roy Weatherby in 1959 there were no commercial propellants that suited the cartridge. Even the standard slow burning powder of the time IMR4350 which was used in the Weatherby line of cartridges was too fast to take advantage of the case capacity of the .30-378 Weatherby cartridge. The result was that performance advantage that was created by the volume of the .30-378 Weatherby was minimal over the competing .300 Weatherby Magnum cartridge, which had been introduced 25 years earlier. However, when launching  bullets which are extremely light for caliber as the Redstone Arsenal contract specified, required the use of relatively faster propellants. However, the hunting public and target shooters used 150 gr and heavier bullets, which require slower burning powders due to the extreme overbore nature of the cartridge.

SAAMI compliant .30-378 Weatherby Magnum cartridge schematic: All dimensions in inches [millimeters].

Performance

The .30-378 Weatherby Magnum is one of the most accurate rifle cartridges. Given factory ammunition, Weatherby guarantees 1.5 MOA accuracy from their Weatherby Mark V action rifles and sub-MOA (.99 MOA or better) accuracy from their Range Certified line of rifles and Vanguard rifle lines. Careful handloading – checking for bullet jacket concentricity, weighing of brass and bullets, uniformity of case length and overall cartridge length, choice of components, seating of bullet – can all increase the accuracy of the cartridge.

The .30-378 Weatherby Magnum is a long range cartridge. It is the most powerful - in terms of energy - .30 caliber production cartridge available. It is also the flattest-shooting .30 caliber factory ammunition available.

Sporting usage
Like all Weatherby rifle cartridges the .30-378 Weatherby was designed to be a high performance hunting cartridge. When released to the public, it is intended for the hunting of all the big game species of North America, Asia and Africa, save dangerous game.

Soon after the .30-378 Weatherby was designed it was adopted by the benchrest shooting community. It became popular among the  shooting communities such as the Original  Club of Pennsylvania and went on to shoot world records at that distance.

The Thompson Long Range shooting school uses the .30-378 Weatherby due to its high accuracy and reliable performance.

See also
 List of rifle cartridges
 Table of handgun and rifle cartridges
 7 mm caliber

References

External links
 Further reloading data at Hodgdon
 .30-378 Weatherby by Chuck Hawks
 The .300 Super Magnums by Chuck Hawks
 Cartridge Dimensions at Steve's Pages

Pistol and rifle cartridges
Weatherby Magnum rifle cartridges